The men's long jump event  at the 1993 IAAF World Indoor Championships was held on 13 March.

Medalists

Note: Daniel Ivanov of Bulgaria had originally won the bronze but he was later disqualified for doping.

Results

Qualification
Qualification: 7.80 (Q) or at least 12 best performers (q) qualified for the final.

Final

References

Long
Long jump at the World Athletics Indoor Championships